The 1872 Waikouaiti by-election was a by-election held on 12 June 1872 in the  electorate during the 5th New Zealand Parliament.

The by-election was caused by the resignation of the incumbent MP George McLean on 19 March 1872.

The by-election was won by David Monro. He addressed the electors thanking them for their support:

See for the names of those nominated:

Results
The following table gives the election result (NB: Mr Thompson got 12 not 11 votes; from the Nelson Examiner subtotals by polling place):

References

Waikouaiti, 1872
1872 elections in New Zealand
Politics of Otago
June 1872 events
Waikouaiti